Kavita Dalal (born 20 September 1986) is an Indian professional wrestler who performed in the WWE under the ring name Kavita Devi, on their developmental territory NXT between 2017 and 2021. Devi is the first female professional wrestler of Indian nationality to wrestle in WWE. Devi previously wrestled on the independent circuit under the ring names Kavita and Hard KD, most notably for Continental Wrestling Entertainment in India.

Personal life
Kavita Devi Dalal, one of the five siblings, was born in Malvi village of Julana tehsil of Jind district of Haryana state of India. She got married in 2009 and gave birth to a child in 2010, after which she wanted to quit sports but inspired by her husband she continued playing. she joined Aam Aadmi Party in April 2022

Weightlifting and powerlifting career 

Devi has represented India in international competition, she won gold in the 75 kg category at the 2016 South Asian Games.

Awards 
 12th South Asian Games
 Gold in women's weightlifting 75 kg

Professional wrestling career

Continental Wrestling Entertainment (2016–2017) 
On 24 February 2016, Kavita Dalal entered the promotion of The Great Khali named Continental Wrestling Entertainment, to begin her training as a professional wrestler. Devi made her debut for the promotion in June 2016, under the ring name Kavita, accepting the "Open Challenge" of B. B. Bull Bull before attacking her. On 25 June, she appeared with a new ring name, Hard KD, teaming with Sahil Sangwan in a losing effort against B. B. Bull Bull and Super Khalsa in the first mixed tag team match in promotion. Kavita cites her trainer The Great Khali as her main inspiration to become a professional wrestler.

WWE (2017–2021) 
On 13 July, she was announced as one of the participants for the Mae Young Classic tournament. On 28 August, Kavita was eliminated in the first round by Dakota Kai.

On 15 October 2017, WWE announced that Devi had signed a contract, and will start training at their Performance Center in January 2018. On 8 April 2018, Devi made her first appearance as part of the company while also making her WrestleMania debut at WrestleMania 34 competing during the inaugural WrestleMania Women's Battle Royal in which she was eliminated by Sarah Logan. On 19 April, Devi made her NXT Live event debut as a heel, teaming with Aliyah against Dakota Kai and Steffanie Newell in a losing effort. She participated in the Mae Young Classic 2018 but lost in the first round against a returning Kaitlyn. On 19 May 2021, it was announced that Devi was released from WWE.

Business ventures
In January 2019, she started trials for selecting players to launch a WWE Super League in India.

See also
 Sakshi Malik
 Phogat sisters
 Badshah Khan (wrestler)

References

External links 

 
 
 

Indian professional wrestlers
1986 births
21st-century Indian women
21st-century Indian people
21st-century professional wrestlers
Indian female professional wrestlers
Indian female weightlifters
Living people
Weightlifters from Haryana
Sport wrestlers from Haryana
South Asian Games gold medalists for India
South Asian Games medalists in weightlifting